Tourism in Brazil is a growing sector and key to the economy of several regions of Brazil. The country had 6.589 million visitors in 2018, ranking in terms of the international tourist arrivals as the second main destination in South America after Argentina and third in Latin America after Mexico and Argentina.  Revenues from international tourists reached  in 2015, continuing a recovery trend from the 2008–2009 economic crisis.

Brazil offers for both domestic and international tourists an ample range of options, with natural areas being its most popular tourism product, a combination of leisure and recreation, mainly sun and beach, and adventure travel, as well as historic and cultural tourism. Among the most popular destinations are beaches at Rio de Janeiro and Santa Catarina, beaches and dunes in the Northeast Region, business trips to São Paulo city, cultural and historic tourism in Minas Gerais, the Iguazu Falls and the Pantanal in the Center-West Region.

In terms of the 2015 Travel and Tourism Competitiveness Index (TTCI), which is a measurement of the factors that make it attractive to develop business in the travel and tourism industry of individual countries, Brazil ranked in the 28th place at the world's level, third in the Americas, after Canada and United States. Brazil main competitive advantages are its natural resources, which ranked 1st on this criteria out of all countries considered, and ranked 23rd for its cultural resources, due to its many World Heritage Sites. The 2013 TTCI report also notes Brazil's main weaknesses: its ground transport infrastructure remains underdeveloped (ranked 129th), with the quality of roads ranking in the 121st place, and quality of air transport infrastructure in 131st; and the country continues to suffer from a lack of price competitiveness (ranked 126th), due in part to high and increasing ticket taxes and airport charges, as well as high and rising prices more generally. Safety and security improved significantly between 2008 and 2013, moving from 128th to 73rd place, before slipping to 106th by 2017.

Foreign tourists mainly come from Argentina, Uruguay, Paraguay, Bolivia, Peru, Ecuador, Colombia, Venezuela, Costa Rica, Mexico, Cuba, the Dominican Republic, the United States, Canada, China, South Korea, Japan, Australia, Chile, Spain, Italy, France, Germany, the United Kingdom, Greece, Ireland, the Netherlands, Belgium, Switzerland, Portugal, and Russia.

International tourism

According to the World Tourism Organization), international travel to Brazil began to grow fast since 2000, particularly during 2004 and 2005. However, in 2006 a slow down took place, and international arrivals have had almost no growth both in 2007 and 2008. In spite of this trend, revenues from international tourism continued to rise, from USD 3.9 billion in 2005 to USD 4.9 billion in 2007, a one billion dollar increase despite 333 thousand less arrivals. This favorable trend is the result of the strong devaluation of the American dollar against the Brazilian real, which began in 2004, but on the other hand, making Brazil a more expensive international destination. This trend changed in 2009, when both visitors and revenues fell as a result of the 2008-2009 economic crisis. By 2010, the industry recovered, and arrivals grew above 2006 levels to 5.16 million international visitors, and receipts from these visitors reached USD 5.9 billion.

Despite continuing record breaking of international tourism revenues, the number of Brazilian tourists travelling overseas has been growing steadily since 2003, resulting in a net negative foreign exchange balance, as more money is spent abroad by Brazilian than receipts from international tourist visiting Brazil. Tourism expenditures abroad grew from USD 5.76 billion in 2006, to USD 8.21 billion in 2007, a 42,45% increase, representing a net deficit of USD 3.26 billion in 2007, as compared to USD 1.45 billion in 2006, a 125% increase from the previous year. This trend is caused by Brazilians taking advantage of the stronger Real to travel and making relatively cheaper expenditures abroad. Brazilian traveling overseas in 2006 represented 3.9% of the country's population.

In 2005, tourism contributed with 3.2% of the country's revenues from exports of goods and services, and represented 7% of direct and indirect employment in the Brazilian economy. In 2006, direct employment in the sector reached 1.87 million people. Domestic tourism is a fundamental market segment for the industry, as 51 million traveled throughout the country in 2005, and direct revenues from Brazilian tourists reached USD 21.8 billion, 5.6 times more receipts than international tourists in 2005.

In 2005, Rio de Janeiro, Foz do Iguaçu, São Paulo, Florianópolis, and Salvador were the most visited cities by international tourists for leisure trips. The most popular destinations for business trips were São Paulo, Rio de Janeiro, and Porto Alegre. In 2006, Rio de Janeiro and Fortaleza were the most popular destinations by national visitors.

Arrivals by country of origin

Comparison with other Latin American destinations

The following is a comparative summary of Brazil's tourism industry key performance indicators as compared with countries considered among the most popular destinations in Latin America, and relevant economic indicators are included to show the relative importance that international tourism has on the economy of the selected countries.

 Notes: Green shadow denotes the country with the top indicator. Yellow shadow corresponds to Brazilian indicators. (1) Visitors and receipts for Cuba correspond to 2011.

Tourist visa

Tourist visa requirements have been waived for citizens of Andorra, Argentina, Australia, Austria, Bahamas, Barbados, Belarus, Belgium, Bolivia, Bulgaria, Canada, Chile, Colombia, Costa Rica, Croatia, Czech Republic, Denmark, Ecuador, Finland, France, Germany, Greece, Guatemala, Guyana, Hong Kong, Hungary, Iceland, India, Ireland, Israel, Italy, Japan, Liechtenstein, Lithuania, Luxembourg, Macau, Malaysia, Malta, Mexico, Monaco, Namibia, Netherlands, New Zealand, Norway, Panama, Paraguay, Peru, Philippines, Poland, Portugal, Qatar, Romania, Russia, San Marino, Singapore, Slovakia, Slovenia, South Africa, South Korea, Spain, Suriname, Sweden, Switzerland, Thailand, Trinidad and Tobago, Turkey, Ukraine, the United Kingdom, the United States,  Uruguay, Vatican City, and Venezuela.

Tourist visas also applies to lecturers at conferences, for visiting relatives and/or friends, unpaid participation in athletic or artistic event or competition (in this case an invitation letter from the sponsoring organization in Brazil is required), and unpaid participation in a scientific/academic seminar or conference sponsored by a research or academic institution (in this case, an invitation letter from the sponsoring organization in Brazil is required).

Paleontological tourism

Geopark Paleorrota is the main area of geotourism in Rio Grande do Sul and one of the most important in Brazil. With  inside  of the state, where many fossils of the Permian and Triassic period, with ages ranging between 210 and 290 million years ago,  when  there were only the continent Pangaea.

In the region Metropolitan Porto Alegre there are 5 museums to visit. In Paleorrota Geopark there are 7 museums, the Palaeobotanical Garden in Mata and the Paleontological Sites of Santa Maria to be visited. The BR-287, nicknamed Highway of Dinosaurs, crosses 17 of 41 municipalities of the geopark.

Ecotourism

Bonito, in Mato Grosso do Sul, is considered the Brazilian capital of ecotourism. This type of tourism also occurs in places like Pantanal and Amazon rainforest, Brotas, Cambará do Sul, Canela, Caravelas, Chapada Diamantina, Chapada dos Veadeiros, Ilha Grande, Ilha do Mel, Iporanga, Itacaré, Itatiaia, Itaúnas State Park, Jalapão, Jericoacoara, Monte Verde, Morro de São Paulo, Pirenópolis, Socorro, Ubatuba and many others.

Domestic tourism

Domestic tourism is a key market segment for the tourism industry in Brazil. In 2005, 51 million Brazilian nationals made ten times more trips than foreign tourists and spent five times more money than their international counterparts. The main destination states in 2005 were São Paulo (27.7%), Minas Gerais (10.8%), Rio de Janeiro (8.4%), Bahia (7.4%), and Santa Catarina (7.2%). The top three states by trip origin were São Paulo (35.7%), Minas Gerais (13.6%).

In terms of tourism revenues, the top earners by state were São Paulo (16.4%) and Bahia (11.7%). For 2005, the three main trip purposes were visiting friends and family (53.1%), sun and beach (40.8%), and cultural tourism (12.5%).

Tourism by regions of Brazil

Southeast Region
 Rio de Janeiro: Rio de Janeiro, Angra dos Reis, Paraty, Resende, Visconde de Mauá, Itatiaia National Park, Petrópolis, Vassouras, Teresópolis, Serra dos Órgãos, Nova Friburgo, Saquarema, Arraial do Cabo, Cabo Frio, Búzios, Ilha Grande
 Espírito Santo: Vitória, Vila Velha, Guarapari, Anchieta, Piúma, Marataízes, São Mateus, Conceição da Barra, Domingos Martins, Santa Teresa
 Minas Gerais: Belo Horizonte, Sabará, Ouro Preto, Congonhas, Mariana, Lavras, São João del-Rei, Tiradentes, Diamantina, Serro, Araxá, Caxambu, São Lourenço, São Thomé das Letras, Capitólio, Camanducaia, Caparaó National Park, Pico da Bandeira, Serra do Cipó National Park, Serra da Canastra National Park
 São Paulo: São Paulo, São Sebastião, Ilhabela, Boiçucanga, Poá, Guararema, Guarujá, Santos, Iguape, Cananéia, São Vicente, Campos do Jordão, Holambra, Campinas, Ribeirão Preto, São José dos Campos, Sorocaba, Americana, Araçatuba, Araraquara, Araras, Atibaia, Barretos, Birigüi, Botucatu, Bragança Paulista, Itu, Jaú

Southern Region
 Paraná: Curitiba, Morretes, Antonina, Paranaguá, Ilha do Mel, Superagui National Park, Foz do Iguaçu, Iguaçu Falls, Guaratuba
 Santa Catarina: Florianópolis, Santa Catarina Island, Joinville, Blumenau, Itapema, Itajaí, Balneário Camboriú
 Rio Grande do Sul: Porto Alegre, Torres, Aparados da Serra National Park, Serra Gaúcha, Canela, Gramado, Paleorrota

Center-West Region
 Federal District:  Brasília
 Goiás: Goiânia, Chapada dos Veadeiros National Park, Pirenópolis, Goiás Velho, Caldas Novas, Emas National Park, Araguaia River
 Mato Grosso: Cuiabá, The Pantanal, Chapada dos Guimarães National Park, Tangará da Serra Waterfall Leap of the Clouds (Salto das Nuvens), Barra do Garças, Alta Floresta, Cáceres, Barão de Melgaço, Poconé
 Mato Grosso do Sul: Campo Grande, Corumbá, Bonito, Ponta Porã, Aquidauana, Coxim, Jardim

Northeast Region
 Bahia: Salvador, Cachoeira, Lençóis, Morro de São Paulo, Ilhéus, Itacaré, Porto Seguro, Arraial d'Ajuda, Trancoso, Chapada Diamantina National Park, Abrolhos Marine National Park
 Pernambuco: Recife, Olinda, Itamaracá, Igarassu, Caruaru, Porto de Galinhas, New Jerusalem, Garanhuns, Triunfo, Fernando de Noronha, Catimbau Valley, Petrolina
 Ceará: Fortaleza, Aracati, Canoa Quebrada, Jericoacoara, Tatajuba, Camocim, Sobral, Baturité, Ubajara National Park, Juazeiro do Norte
 Sergipe: Aracaju, Laranjeiras, São Cristóvão, Estância, Propriá
 Alagoas: Maceió, Maragogi, Penedo, Barra de São Miguel, Paripueira, Porto de Pedras
 Paraíba: João Pessoa, Campina Grande, Cabedelo, Ingá, Baía da Traição, Sousa
 Rio Grande do Norte: Natal, Mossoró,  Tibau do Sul, Tibau, Parnamirim, Touros, São Miguel do Gostoso, Galinhos, Caicó, Macau, Martins, Maxaranguape, Cape São Roque
 Piauí: Teresina, Sete Cidades National Park, Parnaíba, Serra da Capivara National Park
 Maranhão: São Luís, Lençóis Maranhenses National Park, Alcântara, Imperatriz, Carolina

North Region
 Amazonas: Manaus, Parintins, Tefé, Mamirauá
 Pará: Belém, Marajó Island, Santarém
 Tocantins: Palmas, Ilha do Bananal, Natividade
 Amapá: Macapá, Oiapoque
 Roraima: Boa Vista, Monte Roraima
 Rondônia: Porto Velho, Guajará-Mirim, Guaporé Valley
 Acre: Rio Branco, Xapuri, Brasiléia, Assis Brasil

Gallery

See also
Visa policy of Brazil
Ministry of Tourism (Brazil)

References

External links

Brazilian Tourism Portal by Embratur (Brazilian Tourist Board)
New York Times Travel Guides: Brazil

 
Brazil